Ivan Sharrock (born 17 July 1941) is an English sound engineer. He won an Oscar for Best Sound and has been nominated for three more in the same category. He has worked on more than 100 films since 1967.

Selected filmography
Sharrock won an Academy Award for Best Sound and has been nominated for three more:

Won
 The Last Emperor (1987)

Nominated
 U-571 (2000)
 Gangs of New York (2002)
 Blood Diamond (2006)

References

External links

1941 births
Living people
English audio engineers
Best Sound BAFTA Award winners
Best Sound Mixing Academy Award winners
People from St Austell